Damasonium californicum is a species of perennial wildflower in the water plantain family which is known by the common name fringed water-plantain, or star water-plantain.

D. californicum is a plant of wet environments in the western United States including Washington state, Oregon, northern California, Idaho, Nevada, and Montana. It is a resident of ponds, riversides, and vernal pools.

This is a tough-stemmed plant which may live submersed in water or erect on mud or moist soils. The inflorescence yields a flower at the end of each of several long peduncles. The flower has three white or pink petals, each with toothed or fringed ends and sometimes a yellow spot at the base. At the center are six short stamens. After the flower withers the narrow fruits within develop into flat, beaked achenes, several achenes gathered into a star-shaped bunch.

References

External links
Calphotos Photo gallery
Calflora Taxon Report
Aquarium and Pond Plants of the World
Gardening Europe, Piantaggine d acqua Damasonium californicum 

Alismataceae
Freshwater plants
Flora of Idaho
Flora of Oregon
Flora of Nevada
Flora of California
Flora of Montana
Flora of Washington (state)
Plants described in 1857
Flora without expected TNC conservation status